Valley High School may refer to:

United States

Alabama
 Pleasant Valley High School (Alabama), Jacksonville, Alabama
 Valley High School (Alabama), Valley, Alabama

Alaska
 West Valley High School (Alaska), Fairbanks, Alaska
 Tri-Valley School, Healy, Alaska

Arizona
 Valley Christian High School (Arizona), Chandler, Arizona
 Chino Valley High School, Chino Valley, Arizona
 Valley Union High School, Elfrida, Arizona
 Santa Cruz Valley Union High School, Eloy, Arizona
 Deer Valley High School (Arizona), Glendale, Arizona
 Sun Valley High School (Arizona), Mesa, Arizona
 River Valley High School (Arizona), Mohave Valley, Arizona
 Valley Lutheran High School (Phoenix, Arizona), Phoenix, Arizona
 Valley High School (Apache County, Arizona), Sanders, Arizona
 Valley Vista High School (Arizona), Surprise, Arizona

Arkansas
 Valley View High School (Arkansas), Jonesboro, Arkansas
 Fourche Valley School, Yell County, Arkansas
 Valley Springs High School, Valley Springs, Arkansas

California
 Deer Valley High School (California), Antioch, California
 Apple Valley High School (California), Apple Valley, California
 Valley High School (Atwater, California), Atwater, California
 Central Valley High School (Bakersfield, California), Bakersfield, California
 Golden Valley High School (Bakersfield, California), Bakersfield, California
 Bear Valley High School, Bear Valley, Alpine County, California
 Big Valley High School, Bieber, California
 Palo Verde Valley High School, Blythe, California
 Anderson Valley Junior-Senior High School, Boonville, California
 Castro Valley High School, Castro Valley, California
 Surprise Valley High School, Cedarville, California
 Central Valley High School (Ceres, California), Ceres, California
 Valley Christian High School (Cerritos, California), Cerritos, California
 Pleasant Valley High School (California), Chico, California
 Valley Oak Academy, Citrus Heights, California
 Clayton Valley Charter High School, Concord, California
 Ygnacio Valley High School, Concord, California
 West Valley High School (Cottonwood, California), Cottonwood, California
 Round Valley High School, Covelo, California
 San Ramon Valley High School, Danville, California
 Valley Christian School, Dublin, California
 Diego Valley Charter High School, El Cajon, California
 El Cajon Valley High School, El Cajon, California
 Diego Valley Charter High School, Escondido, California
 Valley High School (Escondido, California)
 Fountain Valley High School, Fountain Valley, California
 Valley Vista High School (California), Fountain Valley, California
 Crescent Valley Public Charter, Hanford, California
 West Valley High School (Hemet, California), Hemet, California
 Hoopa Valley High School, Hoopa, California
 Owens Valley High School, Independence, California
 Jurupa Valley High School, Jurupa Valley, California
 Kern Valley High School, Lake Isabella, California
 Antelope Valley High School, Lancaster, California
 Leggett Valley High School, Leggett, California
 Sun Valley High School (California), Sun Valley, Los Angeles, California
 East Valley High School (California), North Hollywood, Los Angeles, California
 Panorama High School, formerly known as East Valley Area New High School #3, Panorama City, Los Angeles, California
 Valley High School (Sepulveda, California), Sepulveda, Los Angeles, California
 West Valley Christian School, West Hills, Los Angeles, California
 Valley High School (Los Banos, California), Los Banos, California
 Valley Oak Academy, Mariposa, California
 Paloma Valley High School, Menifee, California
 Golden Valley High School (Merced, California)
 Valley High School (Merced, California), Merced, California
 Capistrano Valley High School, Mission Viejo, California
 Moreno Valley High School (California), Moreno Valley, California
 Valley View High School (Moreno Valley, California)
 Murrieta Valley High School, Murrieta, California
 Valley Oak High School, Napa, California
 Diego Valley Charter High School, Oceanside, California
 Valley View High School (Ontario, California), Ontario, California
 Pinole Valley High School, Pinole, California
 Amador Valley High School, Pleasanton, California
 Potter Valley High School, Potter Valley, California
 Mountain Valley Academy High School, Ramona, California
 Palm Valley School, Rancho Mirage, California
 Citrus Valley High School Redlands, California
 Redlands East Valley High School Redlands, California
 Golden Valley Charter School, Sacramento, California
 River Valley School, Sacramento, Sacramento, California
 Sacramento Valley School, Sacramento, California
 Upper Valley High School, East Sacramento, Sacramento, California
 Valley High School (Sacramento, California)
 Arroyo Valley High School, San Bernardino, California
 Evergreen Valley High School, San Jose, California
 Valley Christian High School (San Jose, California)
 Capistrano Valley Christian Schools, San Juan Capistrano, California
 Saddleback Valley Christian School, San Juan Capistrano, California
 Dougherty Valley High School, San Ramon, California
 Valley High School (Santa Ana, California)
 Golden Valley High School (Santa Clarita, California)
 Scotts Valley High School Scotts Valley, California
 Central Valley High School (Shasta Lake, California)
 Death Valley Academy, Shoshone, California
 Simi Valley High School, Simi Valley, California
 Sonoma Valley High School, Sonoma, California
 Squaw Valley Academy, Squaw Valley, Placer County, California
 Temecula Valley High School, Temecula, California
 Coachella Valley High School, Thermal, California
 Yokayo Valley Charter High School, Ukiah, California
 Victor Valley High School, Victorville, California
 Central Valley Christian High School, Visalia, California
 San Pasqual Valley High School, Winterhaven, California
 Silver Valley High School, Yermo, California
 River Valley High School (California), Yuba City, California
 Yucca Valley High School, Yucca Valley, California

Colorado
 Ralston Valley High School, Arvada, Colorado
 Valley High School (Colorado), Gilcrest, Colorado

Connecticut
 Shepaug Valley School, Washington, Connecticut
 Valley Regional High School, Deep River, Connecticut

Idaho
 Tri-Valley High School (Idaho), Cambridge, Idaho
 Garden Valley High School, Garden Valley, Idaho
 Valley High School (Idaho), Hazelton, Idaho
 Meadows Valley Junior/Senior High School, New Meadows, Idaho

Illinois
 Metea Valley High School, Aurora, Illinois
 Waubonsie Valley High School, Aurora, Illinois
 Tri-Valley High School (Illinois), Downs, Illinois
 Neuqua Valley High School, Naperville, Illinois

Indiana
 Springs Valley High School, French Lick, Indiana
 Blue River Valley Junior-Senior High School, New Castle, Indiana
 Kankakee Valley High School, Wheatfield Township, Indiana

Iowa
 Valley Lutheran High School (Iowa), Cedar Falls, Iowa
 Southwest Valley High School, Corning, Iowa
 Valley High School (Elgin, Iowa), Elgin, Iowa
 Maple Valley-Anthon Oto High School, Mapleton, Iowa
 Fox Valley Jr./Sr. High School, in Fox Valley Community School District, Milton, Iowa
 Missouri Valley High School, Missouri Valley, Iowa
 Pleasant Valley High School (Iowa), Riverdale, Iowa
 Valley High School (West Des Moines, Iowa), West Des Moines, Iowa

Kansas
 Royal Valley High School, Hoyt, Kansas
 Blue Valley High School, Overland Park, Kansas
 Blue Valley North High School, Overland Park, Kansas
 Blue Valley Northwest High School, Overland Park, Kansas
 Blue Valley Southwest High School, Overland Park, Kansas
 Blue Valley West High School, Overland Park, Kansas
 Mission Valley High School, Wabaunsee County, Kansas

Kentucky
 Valley Traditional High School, Valley Station, Kentucky

Maine
 Sacopee Valley High School, Hiram, Maine
 Mountain Valley High School, Rumford, Maine

Maryland
 Seneca Valley High School, Germantown, Maryland

Massachusetts
 Hoosac Valley High School, Cheshire, Massachusetts
 Assabet Valley Regional Technical High School, Marlborough, Massachusetts

Michigan
 Chippewa Valley High School, Macomb County, Michigan
 Chippewa Valley Schools, Macomb County, Michigan
 Swan Valley High School, Saginaw, Michigan
 Valley Lutheran High School (Michigan), Saginaw, Michigan
 River Valley High School (Michigan), Three Oaks, Michigan
 Maple Valley High School (Michigan), Vermontville, Michigan

Minnesota
 Apple Valley High School (Minnesota), Apple Valley, Minnesota

Missouri
 Valley High School (Caledonia, Missouri), Caledonia, Missouri
 Valley Park High School, Valley Park, Missouri

Montana
 Valley Christian School (Montana), Missoula, Montana

Nebraska
 Valley High School (Nebraska), Valley, Nebraska

Nevada
 Green Valley High School, Henderson, Nevada
 Valley High School (Las Vegas, Nevada)
 Virgin Valley High School, Mesquite, Nevada
 Valley High School (Winchester, Nevada)

New Jersey
 Northern Valley Regional High School at Demarest, Bergen County, New Jersey
 Northern Valley Regional High School at Old Tappan, Bergen County, New Jersey
 Pascack Valley High School, Bergen County, New Jersey
 Rancocas Valley Regional High School, Burlington County, New Jersey
 Delaware Valley Torah Institute, Cherry Hill, New Jersey
 Hopewell Valley Central High School, Hopewell Valley, New Jersey
 Delaware Valley Regional High School, Hunterdon County, New Jersey
 Lenape Valley Regional High School, Morris County, New Jersey
 Passaic Valley Regional High School, Passaic County, New Jersey
 Wayne Valley High School, Passaic County, New Jersey
 Wallkill Valley Regional High School Sussex County, New Jersey

New Hampshire
 ConVal Regional High School (short for Contoocook Valley Regional High School), Peterborough, New Hampshire

New Mexico
 Valley High School (New Mexico), Albuquerque, New Mexico
 Moreno Valley High School (New Mexico), Angel Fire, New Mexico
 Española Valley High School, Española, New Mexico

New York
 Rondout Valley High School, Accord, New York
 Tech Valley High School, at SUNY Polytechnic Institute, Albany, New York
 Tri-Valley Central School, Grahamsville, New York
 Valley Stream Central High School, Valley Stream, New York
 Valley Stream South High School, South Valley Stream, New York

North Carolina
 Sun Valley High School (North Carolina), Monroe, North Carolina

North Dakota
 Central Valley High School (North Dakota), Buxton, North Dakota
 Valley High School (North Dakota), Hoople, North Dakota
 Maple Valley High School (North Dakota), Tower City, North Dakota
 Valley City High School, Valley City, North Dakota

Ohio
 Teays Valley High School, Ashville, Ohio
 Paint Valley High School, Bainbridge, Ross County, Ohio
 River Valley High School (Bidwell, Ohio), Gallia County, Ohio
 Tri-Valley High School (Ohio), Dresden, Ohio
 Indian Valley High School (Ohio), Gnadenhutten, Ohio
 Symmes Valley High School, Lawrence County, Ohio
 Valley High School (Ohio), Lucasville, Ohio
 Sandy Valley High School, Magnolia, Ohio
 Conotton Valley High School, Orange Township, Carroll County, Ohio
 Grand Valley High School, Orwell, Ohio
 Valley Forge High School, Parma Heights, Ohio
 Buckeye Valley High School, Troy Township, Delaware County, Ohio
 Mississinawa Valley High School, Union City, Ohio
 Tuscarawas Valley High School, Zoarville, Ohio

Oregon
 Valley Catholic School, Beaverton, Oregon
 Willamette Valley Christian School, Brooks, Oregon
 Camas Valley Charter School, Camas Valley, Oregon
 Crescent Valley High School, Corvallis, Oregon
 Hidden Valley High School (Oregon), Grants Pass, Oregon
 North Valley High School, Grants Pass, Oregon
 Jordan Valley High School, Jordan Valley, Oregon
 Powder Valley School, North Powder, Oregon
 Siletz Valley Early College Academy, Siletz, Oregon

Pennsylvania
 Juniata Valley Junior/Senior High School, Alexandria, Pennsylvania
 Steel Valley Senior High School, see Steel Valley School District#Senior High School, Allegheny County, Pennsylvania
 Valley View High School (Pennsylvania), Archbald, Pennsylvania
 Sun Valley High School (Pennsylvania), Aston, Pennsylvania
 Chartiers Valley High School, Bridgeville, Pennsylvania
 Pleasant Valley High School (Pennsylvania), Brodheadsville, Pennsylvania
 Great Valley High School, Chester County, Pennsylvania
 Perkiomen Valley High School, Collegeville, Pennsylvania
 Valley Forge Baptist Academy, Collegeville, Pennsylvania
 Turkeyfoot Valley Area Junior/Senior High School, Confluence, Pennsylvania
 Conneaut Valley High School, Conneautville, Pennsylvania
 Twin Valley High School (Pennsylvania), see Berks County, Pennsylvania#Education, Elverson, Pennsylvania
 Allegheny-Clarion Valley Junior/Senior High School, Foxburg, Pennsylvania
 Garnet Valley High School, Glen Mills, Pennsylvania
 Seneca Valley High School (Pennsylvania), Harmony, Pennsylvania
 Tri-Valley Junior/Senior High School, Hegins, Pennsylvania
 Saucon Valley High School, Hellertown, Pennsylvania
 Moshannon Valley Junior/Senior High School, Houtzdale, Pennsylvania
 Conemaugh Valley Junior/Senior High School, Johnstown, Pennsylvania
 Pequea Valley High School, Kinzers, Pennsylvania
 Conestoga Valley High School, Lancaster, Pennsylvania
 Panther Valley High School, Lansford, Pennsylvania
 Schuylkill Valley High School, Leesport, Pennsylvania
 Quaker Valley High School, Leetsdale, Pennsylvania
 Ligonier Valley High School, Ligonier, Pennsylvania
 Saucon Valley High School, Lower Saucon Township, Pennsylvania
 Great Valley High School, Malvern, Pennsylvania
 Cumberland Valley High School, Mechanicsburg, Pennsylvania
 Delaware Valley High School, Milford, Pennsylvania
 Central Valley High School (Pennsylvania), Monaca, Pennsylvania
 Steel Valley High School, see Steel Valley School District, Munhall, Pennsylvania
 Blacklick Valley Junior-Senior High School, Nanty Glo, Pennsylvania
 Redbank Valley Junior/Senior High School, New Bethlehem, Pennsylvania
 Laurel Valley Middle/High School, New Florence, Pennsylvania
 Valley High School (New Kensington, Pennsylvania) also known as Valley Junior/Senior High School, New Kensington, Pennsylvania
 Oley Valley High School, Oley Valley, Pennsylvania
 Delaware Valley Friends School, Paoli, Pennsylvania
 Perkiomen Valley High School, see Perkiomen Valley School District, Perkiomen Township, Montgomery County, Pennsylvania
 Delaware Valley Charter High School, Philadelphia, Pennsylvania
 Wyoming Valley West Senior High School, Plymouth, Luzerne County, Pennsylvania
 Shenandoah Valley Junior/Senior High School, Shenandoah, Pennsylvania
 Oswayo Valley Junior/Senior High School, Shinglehouse, Pennsylvania
 Penns Valley Area Junior/Senior High School, Spring Mills, Pennsylvania
 Mid Valley Secondary Center, Throop, Pennsylvania
 Williams Valley Junior/Senior High School, Tower City, Pennsylvania
 Valley Forge Military Academy and College, Wayne, Pennsylvania
 Cowanesque Valley Junior Senior High School, Westfield, Pennsylvania
 Wyalusing Valley Junior/Senior High School, Wyalusing, Pennsylvania

South Carolina
 Spring Valley High School (South Carolina), Columbia, South Carolina

South Dakota
 Brandon Valley High School, Brandon, South Dakota
 Tri-Valley High School (South Dakota), Colton, South Dakota
 Sioux Valley High School, Volga, South Dakota

Texas
 Smithson Valley High School, Comal County, Texas
 Valley High School (Harlingen, Texas), Harlingen, Texas
 Valley High School (Turkey, Texas), Turkey, Texas

Utah
 Valley High School (Orderville, Utah), Orderville, Utah
 Valley High School (South Jordan, Utah), South Jordan, Utah

Virginia
 Loudoun Valley High School, Purcellville, Virginia
 Hidden Valley High School (Virginia), Roanoke County, Virginia

Washington
 Maple Valley High School (Washington), Maple Valley, Washington
 West Valley High School (Spokane, Washington)
 Central Valley High School (Washington), Spokane Valley, Washington
 West Valley High School (Yakima, Washington)

West Virginia
 Valley High School (Pine Grove, West Virginia)
 Valley High School (Smithers, West Virginia)
 Spring Valley High School (West Virginia), Wayne County, West Virginia

Elsewhere
 Kennebecasis Valley High School, Quispamsis, New Brunswick, Canada
 Madawaska Valley District High School, Barry's Bay, Ontario, Canada
 Valley Heights Secondary School, Walsingham, Ontario, Canada
 Roding Valley High School, Loughton, Essex, England
 Alde Valley Academy, Leiston, Suffolk, England
 Don Valley Academy, Scawthorpe, Doncaster, South Yorkshire, England
 Honley High School, Holme Valley, West Yorkshire, England
 Colne Valley High School, Linthwaite, Huddersfield, West Yorkshire, England
 Philippine Science High School Cagayan Valley Campus, Brgy. Masoc, Bayombong, Nueva Vizcaya, Philippines
 River Valley High School, Singapore

See also
 Central Valley High School (disambiguation)
 East Valley High School (disambiguation)
 Hidden Valley High School (disambiguation)
 River Valley High School (disambiguation)
 Valley Christian High School (disambiguation)
 Valley Lutheran High School (disambiguation)
 Valley View High School (disambiguation)
 Valley Vista High School (disambiguation)
 West Valley High School (disambiguation)